Wanda (also, known as Ichiwanda, Iciwanda, Kiwanda, Vanda, Wandia ) is a Bantu language of Tanzania. It is considered a vulnerable language with less than 43,000 native speakers worldwide. At least half of Wanda people speak limited Swahili, one of the official languages of Tanzania. Speakers are particularly concentrated in Kamsamba ward in Momba District Council and Kipeta ward in Sumbawanga District.

References

Rukwa languages
Languages of Tanzania
Languages of Zambia